Nematoproctus is a genus of fly in the family Dolichopodidae. It has an uncertain position in the family; different authors have included the genus in the subfamily Diaphorinae or the subfamily Rhaphiinae.

Species
Nematoproctus caelebs Parent, 1926
Nematoproctus cylindricus (Van Duzee, 1924)
Nematoproctus daubichensis Stackelberg & Negrobov, 1976
Nematoproctus distendens (Meigen, 1824)
Nematoproctus flavicoxa Van Duzee, 1930
Nematoproctus jucundus Van Duzee, 1927
Nematoproctus kumazawai Negrobov, Tago & Maslova, 2018
Nematoproctus longifilus Loew, 1857
Nematoproctus metallicus Van Duzee, 1930
Nematoproctus praesectus Loew, 1869
Nematoproctus terminalis (Van Duzee, 1914)
Nematoproctus varicoxa Van Duzee, 1930
Nematoproctus venustus Melander, 1900

References

Rhaphiinae
Dolichopodidae genera
Diptera of Europe
Diptera of Asia
Diptera of North America
Taxa named by Hermann Loew